The sunflower seed is the seed of the sunflower (Helianthus annuus). There are three types of commonly used sunflower seeds: linoleic (most common), high oleic, and sunflower oil seeds. Each variety has its own unique levels of monounsaturated, saturated, and polyunsaturated fats. The information in this article refers mainly to the linoleic variety.

For commercial purposes, sunflower seeds are usually classified by the pattern on their husks. If the husk is solid black, the seeds are called black oil sunflower seeds.  The crops may be referred to as oilseed sunflower crops. These seeds are usually pressed to extract their oil. Striped sunflower seeds are primarily eaten as a snack food; as a result, they may be called confectionery sunflower seeds.

The term "sunflower seed" is actually a misnomer when applied to the seed in its pericarp (hull). Botanically speaking, it is a cypsela. When dehulled, the edible remainder is called the sunflower kernel or heart.

Production

In 2020, global production of sunflower seeds was 50 million tonnes, led by Russia and Ukraine with 53% of the world total combined (table). Argentina, China, and Romania also contributed significant volumes.

Usage

Sunflower seeds are more commonly eaten as a snack than as part of a meal. They can also be used as garnishes or ingredients in various recipes. The seeds may be sold as in-shell seeds or dehulled kernels. The seeds can also be sprouted and eaten in salads.

When in-shell seeds are processed, they are first dried. Afterwards, they may also be roasted or dusted with salt or flour for the preservation of flavor.

Sunflower seeds sold by the bag are either eaten plain, salted (sometimes called 'plain') or with flavoring added by the manufacturer. Flavor examples include barbecue, pickle, hot sauce, bacon, ranch, and nacho cheese.

In-shell, sunflower seeds are particularly popular in Mediterranean, Eastern European, and Asian countries where they can be bought freshly roasted and are commonly consumed as street food, the hull being cracked open with the teeth and spat out, while in many countries, they can be bought freshly packed in various roasted flavors. In the United States, they are commonly eaten by baseball players as an alternative to chewing tobacco.

Mechanically dehulled kernels are sold raw or roasted and are sometimes added to bread and other baked goods for their flavor. Sunflower seed brittle is produced by embedding the kernels in hard sugar candy. In Belarus, Russia, Ukraine and Romania, roasted ground seeds are used to make a type of halva. Sunflower butter is similar to peanut butter, but uses sunflower seeds instead of peanuts, and is a common substitute in schools for children with nut allergies. Sunflower seeds are also used as food for pets and wild birds.

Nutrition

In a 100-gram serving, dried whole sunflower seeds provide 584 calories and are composed of 5% water, 20% carbohydrates, 51% total fat and 21% protein (table). The seeds are a rich source (20% or higher of the Daily Value, DV) of protein (42% DV), dietary fiber (36% DV), many B vitamins (23–129% DV) and vitamin E (234% DV). The seeds also contain high levels of dietary minerals, including magnesium, manganese, phosphorus, iron and zinc (40–94% DV).

Half of a 100-gram serving is fat, mainly monounsaturated and polyunsaturated fats, principally linoleic acid. Additionally, the seeds contain phytosterols which may contribute toward lower levels of blood cholesterol.

Pressed oil

Over the decades, sunflower oil has become popular worldwide. The oil may be used as is, or may be processed into polyunsaturated margarines. The oil is typically extracted by applying great pressure to the sunflower seeds and collecting the oil. The protein-rich cake remaining after the seeds have been processed for oil is used as livestock feed.

The original sunflower oil (linoleic sunflower oil) is high in polyunsaturated fatty acids (about 68% linoleic acid) and low in saturated fats, such as palmitic acid and stearic acid. However, various hybrids have been developed to alter the fatty acid profile of the crop for various purposes.

Hulls
The hulls, or shells, mostly composed of cellulose, decompose slowly and may be burned as biomass fuel. Sunflower hulls of the cultivated sunflower (Helianthus annuus) contain allelopathic compounds which are toxic to grasses and the vast majority of cultivated garden plants. Only a small number of garden plants, such as day lilies, are unaffected by the allelopathic compounds found in sunflower hulls.

See also 
 List of edible seeds
 David Sunflower Seeds

References

External links 
 

Bird feeding
Crops originating from the Americas
Crops originating from the United States
Edible fruits
Edible nuts and seeds
Snack foods